Bordetella hinzii is a Gram-negative, oxidase- and catalase-positive, short rod-shaped bacterium from the genus Bordetella isolated from a patient who suffered from cystic fibrosis and from the trachea and lungs of a laboratory mouse.

References

External links
Type strain of Bordetella hinzii at BacDive -  the Bacterial Diversity Metadatabase

Burkholderiales
Bacteria described in 1995